Psychiatry: An Industry of Death is a museum in Hollywood, Los Angeles, California, that has also hosted several touring exhibitions. It is owned and operated by the Citizens Commission on Human Rights (CCHR), an anti-psychiatry organization founded by the Church of Scientology and psychiatrist Thomas Szasz. The museum is located at 6616 Sunset Boulevard, Los Angeles, California. Entry is free.

The opening event on December 17, 2005, was attended by well-known Scientologists such as Priscilla Presley, Lisa Marie Presley, Jenna Elfman, Danny Masterson, Giovanni Ribisi, Catherine Bell, and Anne Archer, as well as former Scientologist Leah Remini.

The museum is dedicated to criticizing what it describes as "an industry driven entirely by profit". It has a variety of displays and exhibits that highlight physical psychiatric treatments, such as restraints, psychoactive drugs, electroconvulsive therapy and psychosurgery (including lobotomy, a procedure abandoned in the 1960s).

The exhibition is also well-known for being the site of a heated confrontation between BBC Panorama reporter John Sweeney, and the Church's then-spokesman Tommy Davis in March 2007, during the filming of Sweeney's documentary Scientology and Me

Film
In 2006, a documentary film also called Psychiatry: An Industry of Death was released on DVD by the Citizens Commission on Human Rights.

Touring
The museum has also had traveling exhibits in places such as Jefferson City, Missouri, St. Louis, and Kansas City.

Exhibits at Worldcon 2006

The museum had a large display area at the 2006 World Science Fiction Convention held in Anaheim, California, United States, at which it presented a variety of exhibits on CCHR's controversial views on psychiatry.

See also

 Scientology and psychiatry

References

External links
 
 CCHR press release
 CNN coverage of the opening
 Los Angeles CityBeat's coverage of the opening

Museums in Los Angeles
Museums established in 2005
Religious museums in California
Scientology and psychiatry
Medical museums in the United States
Buildings and structures in Hollywood, Los Angeles
2005 establishments in California